C. McAlpine was a 19th-century footballer in England. He played 76 games for Burslem Port Vale, although 30 of those were friendlies, which were more prevalent in that era than today.

Career
McAlpine joined Burslem Port Vale in December 1890, making his debut at the Athletic Ground in a 3–0 friendly defeat to rivals Stoke on 20 December, 1890. He was a first team regular and helped the club share the North Staffordshire Charity Challenge Cup in 1891 and win the Staffordshire Charity Cup in 1892. He managed to sign for Darlington and Vale in the summer of 1892 and was obliged to play for the former as he had given them his signature first; he also picked up a six-week suspension for his error. He returned to Vale in October 1892 and was once more a first team regular, playing ten Second Division games in 1892–93, before leaving for good in February 1893.

Career statistics
Source:

Honours
Burslem Port Vale
North Staffordshire Charity Challenge Cup: 1891 (shared)
Staffordshire Charity Cup: 1892

References

English footballers
Association football defenders
Port Vale F.C. players
Darlington F.C. players
English Football League players
Year of birth missing
Year of death missing